Marianna Beauchamp Jodoin (29 November 1881 – 4 January 1980) was a Liberal party member of the Senate of Canada. She was born in Montreal, Quebec.

The daughter of Jean-Joseph Beauchamp and Élisa Décary, she was educated at the Convent d'Hochelaga. In 1905, she married Tancrède Jodoin.

She was appointed to the Senate for the Saurel, Quebec division on 19 May 1953 following nomination by Prime Minister Louis St. Laurent. She remained in that role until her resignation on 1 June 1966.

Jodoin was the first francophone woman and the first woman from Quebec named to the Senate. After her death in 1980, she was entombed at the Notre Dame des Neiges Cemetery in Montreal.

References

External links
 

1881 births
1980 deaths
Canadian senators from Quebec
Women members of the Senate of Canada
Liberal Party of Canada senators
Politicians from Montreal
20th-century Canadian women politicians
Burials at Notre Dame des Neiges Cemetery